The International Institute of Forecasters (IIF) is a non-profit organization based in Medford, Massachusetts and founded in 1981 that describes itself as "dedicated to developing and furthering the generation, distribution, and use of knowledge on forecasting."

Publications

The IIF publishes the following:

 Foresight: The International Journal of Applied Forecasting
 International Journal of Forecasting, published in collaboration with Elsevier
 The Oracle

Conferences

The IIF organizes the annual International Symposium on Forecasting, held in a different location each year. They have also organized and sponsored other conferences and workshops.

IIF has collaborated with other organizations such as the European Central Bank in organizing workshops and conferences.

Other activities

The International Institute of Forecasters sponsored the M3 competition, a forecasting competition whose results were published in a special issue of the International Journal of Forecasting that was made available at reduced cost.

IIF teamed up with the SAS Institute to award two $5000 research grants in 2011.

History
1979   The International Institute of Forecasters was started by J. Scott Armstrong, Spyros Makridakis, Robert Carbone, and Robert Fildes, with support from INSEAD. The first journal was published by Wiley Publishing: the Journal of Forecasting. The objectives of the journal and the future ISFs were to promote the “Science of Forecasting” and scientific research. Within the first 2 years of publication, the journal had one of the highest citation rates.

1981   The first International Symposium on Forecasting (ISF) took place in Quebec with the goal of promoting the journal and generating content. The first conference started with invited papers from important names in the field, including Nobel Prize recipients.

1982   As part of ISF 1982, the IIF first began taking membership

1983   The ISF took place in Philadelphia, with Scott Armstrong as General Chair. Through mass advertising and promotion, including WSJ, Economist, an interview on Voice of America, and a direct mail piece sent to 300,000, the attendance was the highest in ISF history, approximately 1,000 attendees.

For more information on the organization, https://forecasters.org/about/history-of-the-iif/

References

External links
 

Statistical forecasting
Economic research institutes
Non-profit corporations
Medford, Massachusetts
Futures studies organizations